Sanabel TV was a West Bank television station.
According to the CBC Radio show As it happens:

It was shut down in late February 2007.

References

Television stations in the State of Palestine
Mass media in Nablus